Mark Cox (born 25 February 1972) is a Scottish comedian and actor, best known for his role as Tam Mullen in the sitcom Still Game.

Cox was born in Springboig, Glasgow, and attended Saint Andrew's Roman Catholic Secondary School in the East End.

Cox worked with the creators of Still Game in the successful sketch show Chewin' The Fat. It was announced in 2006 that Cox would narrate the Roald Dahl favourite, Three Little Pigs. It made its stage debut at the Glasgow Royal Concert Hall, set to music by composer Paul Patterson. Cox has done some work for Coatbridge College, helping students with their progress through their acting.

In autumn 2014 Cox rejoined the Still Game cast for a sell-out run of live shows in Glasgow at The Hydro.

References

External links

Scottish male television actors
Living people
Male actors from Glasgow
Scottish male comedians
1972 births
Comedians from Glasgow